Meinhart Maur (18 August 1891 – 27 November 1964) was a Hungarian-German film actor. He appeared in more than 40 films between 1919 and 1954. He was born in Hajdúnánás, Hungary and died in London, England.

Selected filmography

 The Howling Wolf (1919)
 Die Tragödie der Manja Orsan (1919) – Jean Tanda – Jurist
 Flimmersterne (1919)
 Ruth's Two Husbands (1919) – Notar Lars Sidellius
 Moderne Töchter (1919)
 The Teahouse of the Ten Lotus Flowers (1919) – Wissenschaftler Dr. Yotamo
 Das Geheimnis des Irren (1919)
 Harakiri (1919) – Prince Matahari
 Kinder der Liebe, 2. Teil (1919)
 Die Toten kehren wieder – Enoch Arden (1919) – Chang-Pu
 Die Nackten – Ein sozialpolitischer Film (1919)
 Die Dame im Pelz (1919) – Graf Sacher-Khun (Maler)
 Der Kampf um die Ehe – 2. Teil: Feindliche Gatten (1919)
 Der Kampf um die Ehe – 1. Teil: Wenn in der Ehe die Liebe stirbt (1919)
 Die silberne Fessel (1920) – Hofnarr
 Die Spinnen, 2. Teil – Das Brillantenschiff (1920) – Chinese Spider
 Sybill Morgan (1920)
 Wibbel the Tailor (1920) – Gefängnisschliesser
 Va banque (1920) – Krojanker
 Nobody Knows (1920) – Ein Gast
 Auf den Trümmern des Paradieses (1920) – Hadschi Halef Omar / Saduk
 The Black Tulip Festival (1920) – Isaac Tichelaer
 Die Todeskarawane (1920) – Hadschi Halef Omar
 Berlin W. (1920) – Chefredakteur Nebeling
 Zügelloses Blut. 2. Die Diamantenfalle (1920)
 Zügelloses Blut. 1. Luxusfieber (1920)
 Die Teufelsanbeter (1920) – Hadschi Halef Omar
 Dämmernde Nächte (1920) – Jörn Skaare
 The Last Witness (1921)
 Elixiere des Teufels (1922)
 The Voice of the Heart (1924) – Helgas Vater
 Regine (1927) – Der Diener
 The Trunks of Mr. O.F. (1931) – Arzt
 Rembrandt (1936) – Ornia (uncredited)
 Second Bureau (1936) – Gen. von Raugwitz
 O-Kay for Sound (1937) – Guggenheimer
 Doctor Syn (1937) – Mulatto
 The Last Barricade (1938) – Don Jose
 Who Goes Next? (1938) – Commandant
 The Return of the Frog (1938) – 'Dutchy' Alkmann
 21 Days (1940) – Carl Grunlich
 An Englishman's Home (1940) – Waldo
 Pack Up Your Troubles (1940) – (uncredited)
 Band Waggon (1940) – German General (uncredited)
 Three Silent Men (1940) – Karl Zaroff
 Jeannie (1941)
 We'll Smile Again (1942) – Herr Steiner
 Candlelight in Algeria (1944) – Schultz
 It's Not Cricket (1949) – Maharajah
 The Huggetts Abroad (1949) – Jeweller
 The Wooden Horse (1950) – Hotel Proprietor
 Dick Barton at Bay (1950) – Serge Volkoff
 The Tales of Hoffmann (1951) – Luther
 Decameron Nights (1953) – Sultan
 Never Let Me Go (1953) – Lemkov
 Malaga (1954) – Jakie (uncredited)

References

External links
 

1891 births
1964 deaths
20th-century German male actors
German emigrants to England
German expatriate male actors in the United Kingdom
German male film actors
German male silent film actors
People from Hajdúnánás
People of Hungarian German descent
Hungarian emigrants to Germany